Mohamed Ahmed Saeed Ahmed El Fadul (born 20 October 1997), commonly known as Mohamed Ering is a Sudanese professional footballer who plays as a defender for Al-Hilal Omdurman and the Sudan national football team.

References 
 

Living people
1997 births
Sudanese footballers
Sudan international footballers
Association football defenders
Al-Hilal Club (Omdurman) players